Matthew Frumin is an American politician and activist who serves as Ward 3 member of the Council of the District of Columbia. Before serving on the DC Council, Frumin worked as an international trade attorney and was active on local education issues.

Early life and education
Frumin grew up near Detroit, the son of a psychiatrist who later unsuccessfully ran for Congress.

Career
Frumin served as a Clinton appointee in the State Department. He was a major fundraiser for Clinton, where he was a member of the fundraising group known as the "Saxophone Club". After leaving government, he worked as an international trade attorney and was a partner of the law firm Cassidy Levy Kent.

Politics
In 2000, he ran against Joe Knollenberg in a Michigan congressional district. Frumin fared better than his father, who ran against Knollenberg four years earlier in the solidly Republican district.

Frumin began his work in local DC politics through his ANC, serving as chair of 3E and various Council and mayoral taskforces. He was an advocate for improvements to public schools in Ward 3, including Janney Elementary, Deal Middle and Wilson High School In 2013, Frumin ran for a vacant at-large seat on the DC Council after Phil Mendelson became chair of the Council. Frumin outraised many of his competitors, but came in fourth place with 11 percent of the vote. He was supported by filmmaker Aviva Kempner and wavered about whether he would hold outside employment if elected.

In 2022, following incumbent Mary Cheh's announcement that she would not seek another term, Frumin announced his candidacy. He won the April primary after many candidates dropped out days before the election to support his campaign.

Positions
In his 2022 campaign, Frumin said that "alleviating school overcrowding and increasing access to affordable housing" were "the most pressing issues facing Ward 3.

Committees 
Frumin serves on the following committees:

Committee on Executive Administration and Labor

Committee on Hospital and Health Equity

Committee on Transportation and the Environment

Committee on Facilities and Family Services

Committee on Housing

Personal life
Frumin lives in American University Park. He has three adult children who all attended Wilson High School. He is active in the Washington Interfaith Network.

Electoral History

References

21st-century American politicians
University of Michigan alumni
Living people
Members of the Council of the District of Columbia
George Washington University alumni
Washington, D.C., government officials
Year of birth missing (living people)